The Tourists were a British rock and pop band. They achieved brief success in the late 1970s before the band split in 1980. Two of its members, singer Annie Lennox and guitarist Dave Stewart, went on to international success as Eurythmics.

Early history
Guitarists Peet Coombes and Dave Stewart were members of the folk rock band Longdancer, which was on Elton John's Rocket Records label. They moved to London, where they met singer Annie Lennox, who had dropped out of a course at the Royal Academy of Music to pursue her ambitions in pop music.

Forming a band in 1976, the three of them initially called themselves The Catch. In 1977 the band released a single named "Borderline/Black Blood" on Logo Records. It was released in the UK, The Netherlands, Spain and Portugal, but was not a commercial success.

The Tourists
By 1976, they had recruited bass guitarist Eddie Chin and drummer Jim Toomey, and renamed themselves The Tourists. This saw the beginning of a productive period for the band and they released three albums: The Tourists (1979), Reality Effect (1979) and Luminous Basement (1980), as well as half a dozen singles, including "Blind Among the Flowers" (1979), "The Loneliest Man in the World" (1979), "Don't Say I Told You So" (1980) and two hits, the Dusty Springfield cover "I Only Want to Be with You" (1979) and "So Good to Be Back Home Again" (1980), both of which reached the top 10 in the UK.

"I Only Want to Be with You" was also a top 10 hit in Australia and reached number 83 on the US Billboard Hot 100. Coombes was the band's main songwriter, although later releases saw the first compositions by Lennox and Stewart.

In 1980, the band signed to RCA Records. They toured extensively in the UK and abroad, including as support for Roxy Music on their 1979 Manifesto Tour. The group disbanded in late 1980.

After the break-up
Coombes and Chin began a new project named Acid Drops but this met with little success and Coombes, despite originally being the main artistic force behind the Tourists, drifted out of the music business after the disbanding. 
Lennox and Stewart soon split as a couple but decided to continue working as an experimental musical partnership, under the name Eurythmics. They retained their RCA recording contract and links with Conny Plank, who produced their first album In the Garden in 1981.
 
Coombes' death in late 1997 acted as a catalyst for Lennox and Stewart to revive their friendship and musical partnership, after they had previously disbanded Eurythmics in 1990.
 
Drummer Jim Toomey published the book We Were Tourists in 2018, describing the band's career.

Band members 
 Peet Coombes – vocals, guitar
 David A. Stewart – guitar
 Annie Lennox – vocals, keyboards
 Eddie Chin – bass guitar
 Jim Toomey – drums

Discography

Albums

Singles

References

External links 

English power pop groups
English new wave musical groups
Musical groups established in 1977
Musical groups disestablished in 1980
Rocket Records artists
RCA Records artists
Epic Records artists
Eurythmics